Kiplyn Davis (July 1, 1979 — May 2, 1995) was a 15-year-old American high school student who disappeared from her high school campus in Spanish Fork, Utah. She is one of the featured children on the Polly Klaas Foundation website.  In 2011, a classmate was convicted of manslaughter in the murder of Davis and sentenced to 15 years in prison. However, the man refused to name his alleged accomplices or indicate where Davis's remains were supposedly concealed.

Disappearance 
Davis, a sophomore, was last seen at Spanish Fork High School in Spanish Fork, Utah. That morning she  had an argument with her parents then arrived early to school. She subsequently attended all of her morning classes and was last seen at lunchtime in the school's cafeteria with her friends and classmates. She did not show up for her fourth and fifth period classes. However, one close friend said he spoke with her between fourth and fifth period but later changed his story. All of her personal belongings, including her purse, makeup, dental retainer and schoolbooks, were left in her locker at school and she never returned home for the day. It has been testified that she told friends that she would not be attending activities planned that evening, and in fact, had mentioned it would be better if she ran away. She was reported missing when she failed to arrive home at 5pm when she was always home by 3:30pm.

After months passed without Davis' return or any clues as to her whereabouts, police began to suspect foul play in her disappearance. Although she had an argument with her parents the day of her disappearance and mentioned running away, her family believes she was murdered. After her disappearance there were various rumors that her body was buried either in a nearby canyon, a train tunnel, under a building, and various other locations, but her remains have never been located. Four years after her disappearance, her family held a memorial service for Davis and put up a marker in her name at the Spanish Fork City Cemetery.

Investigation 

In 2003, U.S. Attorney Paul Warner revived the probe into Davis's death.  Timmy Brent Olsen and Christopher Neal Jeppson had been charged with her murder.

On May 6, 2009 the Utah State prosecutors dropped the murder charges against Christopher Neal Jeppson instead of seeking the death penalty. In court he pled no contest to obstruction related charges and ultimately signed an affidavit that he does not know the circumstances or cause of Kiplyn Davis's disappearance.

Rucker Leifson pleaded guilty to one count of lying to a grand jury and was sentenced to four years in prison. Gary Blackmore and Scott Brunson have also been found guilty of lying to a grand jury. Their sentences hinge upon their testimony against Olsen.

On June 1, 2009, news of a decision by the judge on a motion to dismiss the murder charge against Olsen was announced. The judge decided to defer any ruling on the motion in the case, stating he had not heard all the evidence from the prosecutors. An evidentiary hearing to establish whether there is evidence of death is still possible.

On February 11, 2011, Timmy Brent Olsen pleaded guilty to manslaughter and was sentenced to 15 years in prison. He claimed he saw another individual hit Davis in the head with a rock and helped him move her body, but declined to name the other individual. Although he admitted that he helped move and bury the body, he refuses to tell authorities where the body is located. Olson and Leifson had come under suspicion after claiming they left school with Davis on the day she disappeared.

In popular culture
The crime documentary series Nightmare Next Door released an episode about Kiplyn's disappearance, subtitled Stealing Beauty (season 8, episode 1, air date: January 24, 2014).

Crime podcast Crime Junkie covered Kiplyn’s disappearance in an episode called “MISSING: Kiplyn Davis”.

Youtube Missing Persons Channel "Danelle Hallan" also covered Kiplyn Davis' case.

See also
List of solved missing person cases

References

1979 births
1990s missing person cases
1995 deaths
1995 in Utah
1995 murders in the United States
Female murder victims
Incidents of violence against women
May 1995 events in the United States
Missing American children
Missing person cases in Utah
Murder convictions without a body
Kidnapped American children
People from Spanish Fork, Utah
Violence against women in the United States
History of women in Utah